The 3d Maneuver Enhancement Brigade (3d MEB) was a United States Army brigade located at Fort Richardson, Alaska. The 3d MEB was one of three active duty Maneuver Enhancement Brigades. The Brigade was tasked to improve the movement capabilities and rear area security for commanders at division level or higher. It was inactivated in 2011 and replaced by the 2d Engineer Brigade.

The 3d MEB was composed of:
 Headquarters & Headquarters Company
  6th Engineer Battalion
  793d Military Police Battalion
  17th Combat Sustainment Support Battalion

References

External links 
 Official homepage
 

3 003
Military units and formations established in 2008
Military units and formations disestablished in 2011